Paliepiai ('place under lime trees', formerly) is a village in Kėdainiai district municipality, in Kaunas County, in central Lithuania. According to the 2011 census, the village had a population of 38 people.

At the beginning of the 20th century there were watermill, distillery and manor (a property of the Daugirdos family).

Demography

References

Villages in Kaunas County
Kėdainiai District Municipality